Creagh is a civil parish located in the counties of Galway and Roscommon. It is the civil parish of Ballinasloe, County Galway.

Townlands
Creagh has 40 townlands:

County Roscommon
Ardcarn
Atticorra
Attyrory
Ballygortagh
Ballyhugh
Beagh Brabazon
Beagh Naghten
Beagh Trench
Beaghbeg
Bellagill
An Choilleach Bheag
Clarary
Cloonaghbrack
Clooneen
Coolderry
Cuilleen
Culliagharny
Culliaghbeg
Glentaun
Gortnasharvoge
Kilgarve
Laughil
Meadow
Newtown
Parkmore
Rooaun Bog and Meadow
Sralea
Suckfield
Tóin le Móin
Tonalig
Tonlemone
Tulrush

County Galway
Ashford
Atticorra
Cleaghbeg
Cleaghgarve
Creagh
Glentaun
Kilgarve
Parkmore
Portnick
Rooaun
Townparks

References

Ballinasloe
Civil parishes of County Galway
Civil parishes of County Roscommon